In geometry, topology, and related branches of mathematics, a closed set is a set whose complement is an open set. In a topological space, a closed set can be defined as a set which contains all its limit points. In a complete metric space, a closed set is a set which is closed under the limit operation. 
This should not be confused with a closed manifold.

Equivalent definitions 

Yet another equivalent definition is that a set is closed if and only if it contains all of its boundary points. 

An alternative characterization of closed sets is available via sequences and nets.  A subset  of a topological space  is closed in  if and only if every limit of every net of elements of  also belongs to  In a first-countable space (such as a metric space), it is enough to consider only convergent sequences, instead of all nets.  One value of this characterization is that it may be used as a definition in the context of convergence spaces, which are more general than topological spaces. Notice that this characterization also depends on the surrounding space  because whether or not a sequence or net converges in  depends on what points are present in  

a subset is closed if and only if it contains every point that is close to it. 

In terms of net convergence, a point  is close to a subset  if and only if there exists some net (valued) in  that converges to  

More about closed sets 

The notion of closed set is defined above in terms of open sets, a concept that makes sense for topological spaces, as well as for other spaces that carry topological structures, such as metric spaces, differentiable manifolds, uniform spaces, and gauge spaces. 

Whether a set is closed depends on the space in which it is embedded. Stone–Čech compactification, a process that turns a completely regular Hausdorff space into a compact Hausdorff space, may be described as adjoining limits of certain nonconvergent nets to the space.

Furthermore, every closed subset of a compact space is compact, and every compact subspace of a Hausdorff space is closed.

Properties 

A closed set contains its own boundary. In other words, if you are "outside" a closed set, you may move a small amount in any direction and still stay outside the set. Note that this is also true if the boundary is the empty set, e.g. in the metric space of rational numbers, for the set of numbers of which the square is less than  

 Any intersection of any family of closed sets is closed (this includes intersections of infinitely many closed sets)
 The union of  closed sets is closed.
 The empty set is closed.
 The whole set is closed.

The intersection property also allows one to define the closure of a set  in a space  which is defined as the smallest closed subset of  that is a superset of 
Specifically, the closure of  can be constructed as the intersection of all of these closed supersets.

Sets that can be constructed as the union of countably many closed sets are denoted Fσ sets.  These sets need not be closed.

Examples 
 The closed interval  of real numbers is closed. (See  for an explanation of the bracket and parenthesis set notation.)
 Some sets are neither open nor closed, for instance the half-open interval  in the real numbers.
 Some sets are both open and closed and are called clopen sets.
 The ray  is closed.
 The Cantor set is an unusual closed set in the sense that it consists entirely of boundary points and is nowhere dense.
 Singleton points (and thus finite sets) are closed in T1 spaces and Hausdorff spaces.
 The set of integers  is an infinite and unbounded closed set in the real numbers.

See also

Notes

References 

  
  
  
  

General topology